Miroslav Macek (born 7 December 1944 in Litomyšl, Protectorate of Bohemia and Moravia) is a politician, writer and former deputy prime minister of Czechoslovakia.
In May 2006 Macek made international news when, coming from behind, he struck the Minister of Health David Rath at a dentists' conference, accusing him of having insulted his wife (after Rath had publicly stated that Macek had married his wife for money).

Writer
In 2017, he published his novel Saturnin se vrací (Saturnin Returns), a sequel to Zdeněk Jirotka's acclaimed novel, Saturnin.

Books by Macek
Jak se stát labužníkem (2004)
Saturnin se vrací (2017)

References

External links
Macek's blog 

1944 births
Living people
People from Litomyšl
Czech dentists
Czech translators
Czech male novelists
Civic Democratic Party (Czech Republic) Government ministers
Translators of William Shakespeare
20th-century translators
21st-century Czech novelists